Eben-Ezer University of Minembwe was co-founded in 2011 and is led by Dr. Lazare R. Sebitereko. The university is the only university in the area and focuses on entrepreneurship, development and teaching skills. The universities main mission is sustainable community development and prioritizes in training the rural youth. The University has recently been partnering with Cornell University, who helps provide two courses at the college.

Faculty
The university currently has 4 faculties:
Theology
Education sciences
Health Sciences
Agricultural and development sciences

References

External links

Universities in the Democratic Republic of the Congo
Educational institutions established in 2011
2011 establishments in the Democratic Republic of the Congo